351 or variation, may refer to:
 351 (number), a number in the 300s range
 AD 351 (CCCLI) a year in the Common Era
 351 BC, the year before the common era

Places
 Area code 351, for telephones for Northeast Massachusetts
 +351 country code for telephones for Portugal
 351 Yrsa, asteroid #351, the 351st asteroid registered, a Main Belt asteroid
 351 (building), downtown, St. John's, Newfoundland Island, Newfoundland and Labrador, Canada; an office building
 List of highways numbered 351 for Route 351

Military and weaponry
 .351 Winchester Self-Loading ammunition
 Type 351 Radar
 351st Operations Group
 351st Division (Imperial Japanese Army)
 351st Reconnaissance Aviation Squadron
 No. 351 Squadron RAF
 , Indonesian navy frigate, pennant number 351
 , Turkish navy destroyer
 , WWII U.S. Navy destroyer escort
 , WWII U.S. Navy destroyer
 , WWII German submarine
 , WWII Japanese submarine class

Vehicles and transportation
 Ford 351 (disambiguation), several engines
 Peterbilt 351, a truck tractor unit
 GS&WR Class 351 locomotive
 351 (New Jersey bus)

Other uses
 Japan Airlines Flight 351, a hijacked flight

See also

 B.1.351, a variant of COVID-19 SARS-CoV-2 virus found in South Africa